Hilary Bell (born June 18, 1991 in Toronto, Ontario) is a female swimmer from Canada, who mostly competes in the freestyle events. She claimed two silver relay medals at the 2007 Pan American Games in Rio de Janeiro, Brazil. Bell represented Canada at the 2006 World Youth Championship in Rio de Janeiro.

References
Profile Canadian Olympic Committee

1991 births
Living people
Canadian female freestyle swimmers
Swimmers from Toronto
Swimmers at the 2007 Pan American Games
Pan American Games silver medalists for Canada
Pan American Games medalists in swimming
Medalists at the 2007 Pan American Games